Robert Kirkham (born ca. 1579) was an English politician who sat in the House of Commons between 1628 and 1629.

Kirkham was of Middlesex. He matriculated at Christ Church, Oxford in February 1598, aged 18 and was awarded BA on 24 October 1601. He was a student of Lincoln's Inn in 1601. He was elected MP for St Albans in 1628 and sat until 1629 when King Charles decided to rule without parliament for eleven years.

References

1570s births
Year of death missing
English MPs 1628–1629
Alumni of Christ Church, Oxford